Hispavisión will be a song festival promoted by RTVE in which the nations of the Spanish-speaking world will participate, along with Brazil and Portugal. The inaugural edition will be hosted in Cartagena, Colombia in 2023. The contest's format (participation, voting, etc.) is yet to be defined but, RTVE president, José Manuel Pérez Tornero, says it will have a format similar to Eurovision, with elimination rounds by country and a grand final. The new music competition was announced on February 16, 2022, at the first Ibero-American Forum on Audiovisual Public Service.

References

Song contests
RTVE
Spanish-language music
Recurring events established in 2023